The 2014 TCU Horned Frogs baseball team represented Texas Christian University (TCU) in the 2014 college baseball season. TCU competed in Division I of the National Collegiate Athletic Association (NCAA) as a  member of the Big 12 Conference. The Horned Frogs played home games at Lupton Stadium on the university's campus in Fort Worth, Texas. Eleventh year head coach Jim Schlossnagle led the Horned Frogs.

Personnel

Coaches

Players

Schedule

Ranking movements

References

External links
 Official website

TCU Horned Frogs baseball seasons
TCU
TCU
College World Series seasons
TCU